Caloptilia chloroptila is a moth of the family Gracillariidae. It is known from Guyana.

References

chloroptila
Gracillariidae of South America
Moths described in 1915